The 2003 Men's Hockey Hamburg Masters was the ninth edition of the Hamburg Masters, consisting of a series of test matches. It was held in Hamburg, Germany, from 27 to 29 June 2003, and featured four of the top nations in men's field hockey.

Competition format
The tournament featured the national teams of Argentina, India, Spain, and the hosts, Germany, competing in a round-robin format, with each team playing each other once. Three points were awarded for a win, one for a draw, and none for a loss.

Officials
The following umpires were appointed by the International Hockey Federation to officiate the tournament:

 Björn Bachmann (GER)
 Henrik Ehlers (AUT)
 Daniel Santí (ARG)
 Guillermo Sánchez (ESP)
 Javeed Sheikh (IND)

Results
All times are local (Central European Summer Time).

Pool

Fixtures

Statistics

Final standings

Goalscorers

References

External links
Deutscher Hockey-Bund
Official website

2003
Hamburg Masters
2003 in German sport
Sport in Hamburg
June 2003 sports events in Europe